The cabinet led by Prime Minister Amir Abbas Hoveyda inaugurated on 26 January 1965 to succeed the cabinet of Hassan Ali Mansur who assassinated on 21 January. Like its predecessor the cabinet was led by the Iran Novin Party.

List of ministers
The cabinet was consisted of the following members.

Changes
In 1966 Abbas Aram, minister of foreign affairs, was replaced by Ardeshir Zahedi.

References

External links

1965 establishments in Iran
1967 disestablishments in Iran
Cabinets of Iran
Cabinets established in 1965
Cabinets disestablished in 1967